SM City Valenzuela is a shopping mall owned and operated by SM Prime Holdings, the largest retail and mall operator in the Philippines. It is located along MacArthur Highway, Barangay Karuhatan, Valenzuela City. Opened on October 28, 2005, it is the first SM Supermall in Valenzuela City and in the CAMANAVA Area. It is also the 21st SM Supermall in the Philippines after SM City San Lazaro in Santa Cruz, Manila.

History 
The lot where the mall currently stands was formerly owned by the Saint Vincent Seminary, which was transferred to Tandang Sora, Quezon City, and became the storage lot of San Miguel Brewery. In 2003, the construction of the mall commenced.

SM City Valenzuela was opened on October 28, 2005, which was known then as SM Supercenter Valenzuela until 2009. From 2009 until October 25, 2018, it was named as SM Center Valenzuela. On October 26, 2018, SM City Valenzuela was officially launched with the opening of The SM Store. This is the third SM Supermall that was upgraded from an SM Center to SM City after Sucat and Molino.

Mall anchors 
SM City Valenzuela is anchored by SM STORE and SM HYPERMARKET. It also has SM SUPERMALLS junior anchors and retail affiliates such as SM Appliance Center, Watsons, Cyberzone, ACE Hardware, BDO, National Book Store.

Gallery

See also
 SM North EDSA
 List of shopping malls in Metro Manila

References

External links 
SM Supermalls - Official Website
SM City Valenzuela on Facebook

Shopping malls in the Philippines
SM Prime
Shopping malls established in 2005
2005 establishments in the Philippines
Buildings and structures in Valenzuela, Metro Manila